Sokol is an Albanian masculine given name and may refer to:
Sokol Baci (1837–1920), Albanian revolutionary, chief of the Gruda
Sokol Bishanaku (born 1971), Albanian weightlifter
Sokol Bulku (born 1978), Albanian footballer
Sokol Çela (born 1988), Albanian footballer 
Sokol Gjoka (born 1958), Albanian diplomat 
Sokol Kushta (born 1964), Albanian footballer
Sokol Maliqi (born 1981) Kosovar footballer
Sokol Mziu (born 1987), Albanian footballer
Sokol Olldashi (1972–2013), Albanian politician
Sokol Shameti (born 1978), Albanian journalist

Albanian masculine given names